The  was an army of the Imperial Japanese Army during the final days of World War II.

History
The Japanese 35th Army was raised on July 26, 1944 in the Japanese-occupied Philippines in anticipation of Allied attempts to invade and retake Mindanao and the Visayan islands in central and southern Philippines. It was under the overall command of the Japanese Fourteenth Area Army. Initially intended as a garrison force to withstand a long-term war of attrition, as the war situation on the Pacific front grew increasingly desperate for Japan, the Imperial General Headquarters ordered the bulk of the IJA 35th Army to Leyte as reinforcement to Japanese forces in the Battle of Leyte to fight against the combined American and Philippine Commonwealth troops. As the battle was lost, surviving units were given independent command authority, and were ordered to go to ground and wage a guerilla campaign on their respective islands for as long as possible. The IJA 35th Army was officially disbanded on April 19, 1945. Some individual Japanese stragglers did not give up until the 1970s.

List of commanders

Commanding Officer

Chief of Staff

Structure

Japanese 35th Army
 16th Infantry Division
 30th Infantry Division
 100th Infantry Division
 102nd Infantry Division
 IJA 54th Independent Mixed Brigade

References

External links

35
Military units and formations established in 1944
Military units and formations disestablished in 1945